Stary Garbów  is a village in the administrative district of Gmina Dwikozy, within Sandomierz County, Świętokrzyskie Voivodeship, in south-central Poland.

The village has a population of 224. It is most notable as the hometown of Zawisza Czarny (c. 1379–1428), a Polish knight and national hero.

References

Villages in Sandomierz County